Misery is an American psychological horror thriller novel written by Stephen King and first published by Viking Press on June 8, 1987. The novel's narrative is based on the relationship of its two main characters – the romance novelist Paul Sheldon and his deranged self-proclaimed number one fan Annie Wilkes. When Paul is seriously injured following a car accident, former nurse Annie brings him to her home, where Paul receives treatment and doses of pain medication. Paul realizes that he is a prisoner and is forced to indulge his captor's whims.

The novel's title has two meanings: it is the name carried by the central heroine of Paul's book series, and King described such a state of emotion during the novel's writing. He has stated that Annie is a stand-in for cocaine. King has outlined the creation of Misery in his memoirs, and mentioned that the image of Annie Wilkes came to him in a dream. King planned the book to be released under the pseudonym Richard Bachman, but his identity was discovered before the book's release.

Misery won the first Bram Stoker Award for Novel in 1987 and was nominated for the 1988 World Fantasy Award for Best Novel. Critical reception of Misery was positive – reviewers praised King for avoiding the fantasy elements of his past works, and noted the novel's parallels with King's personal life and the study of the relationship between celebrities and their fans. The novel, which took fourth place in the 1987 bestseller list, was adapted into an Academy Award-winning film directed by Rob Reiner in 1990, and into a theatrical production starring Laurie Metcalf and Bruce Willis in 2015.

Plot
Paul Sheldon is the author of the best-selling series of Victorian era romance novels featuring the character Misery Chastain, which he privately disdains. He has thus written the final installment, Misery's Child, in which Misery is killed off. After completing the manuscript for his new crime novel, Fast Cars, which he hopes will receive serious literary acclaim and kickstart his post-Misery career, Paul gets drunk and drives to Los Angeles instead of flying back home to New York City. He is caught in a snowstorm and crashes his car in the small, remote town of Sidewinder, Colorado.

He awakens to find that he has been rescued by Annie Wilkes, a local former nurse who is a devoted fan of the Misery series. She keeps Paul in her guest bedroom, refuses to take him to the hospital despite his broken legs, and nurses him herself using her illicit stash of codeine-based painkillers. Paul quickly becomes addicted to a medication named Novril, which Annie withholds in order to threaten and manipulate him. She begins reading the recently published Misery's Child and coerces permission to read the Fast Cars manuscript, but disapproves of the darker subject matter and profanity. Paul assesses that Annie is mentally unstable: she is prone to trailing off into catatonic episodes and has sudden, unpredictable bouts of rage. When she learns of Misery's death, she leaves Paul alone in her house for over two days, depriving him of food, water, and painkillers. During this time, Paul examines his legs and sees that they have been pulverized and deformed in the car crash. 

Upon Annie's return, she forces a weakened Paul to burn the Fast Cars manuscript in exchange for his painkillers. Annie sets up an office for Paul – consisting of an antique Royal typewriter with a non-functional N-key, writing paper, and a wheelchair – for the purpose of writing a new Misery novel that will bring the character back from the dead. Biding his time and likening himself to Scheherezade, Paul begins a new book, Misery's Return, and allows Annie to read the work in progress and fill in the missing N's. As Paul writes, the text includes excerpts of Misery's Return, a macabre story in which it is found that Misery was buried alive while comatose.

Paul manages to escape his room using his wheelchair on several occasions, searching for more painkillers and exploring the house. He discovers a scrapbook full of newspaper clippings about deaths that reveal Annie to be a serial killer; her victims include a neighboring family, her own father, her roommate and, while she worked as a head nurse, many elderly or critically injured patients and eleven infants, the last resulting in her standing trial but being acquitted in Denver. When Annie discovers that Paul has been leaving his room, she punishes him by cutting off his foot with an axe and cauterizing his ankle with a blowtorch, "hobbling" him.

Months later, Paul remains Annie's captive. After he complains that more typewriter keys have broken and refuses to tell Annie how the novel ends before he has written it, she cuts off his thumb with an electric knife.

A state trooper arrives at Annie's house in search of Paul, and Annie murders the officer by running him over with her riding lawnmower. Annie hides the remains, but the trooper's disappearance draws attention from law enforcement and the media. Annie relocates Paul to the basement. It becomes clear that she does not intend to let him live. After Misery's Return is finished, Paul lights a decoy copy of the manuscript on fire, which Annie attempts to save. Paul throws the typewriter at Annie and engages her in a violent fight; he manages to escape the bedroom and lock Annie inside. Paul then hides and alerts the police when they return in search of the murdered trooper. Annie is found dead from her injuries in the barn — she apparently escaped through a window and was on her way to murder Paul with a chainsaw.

After Paul has returned to New York, Misery's Return is set to be published and becomes an international bestseller due to the interest in the circumstances under which it was written. Paul resists the suggestion to write a nonfiction account of his own experiences. He is able to walk with a prosthesis but still struggles with nightmares about Annie, withdrawal from painkillers, alcoholism, and writer's block. When Paul finds random inspiration to write a new story, he weeps both out of mourning for his shattered life, and in the joy that he is finally able to write again.

Background
One of Stephen King's inspirations for Misery was the reaction his fans had to his 1984 novel The Eyes of the Dragon. Many fans rejected The Eyes of the Dragon because it was an epic fantasy book, with virtually none of the horror that initially made his reputation. Paul Sheldon feeling chained to the Misery books by his fans was a metaphor for King's feeling chained to horror fiction. Another source was King's addiction to drugs and alcohol, and his struggle to get sober. He stated: "Take the psychotic nurse in Misery, which I wrote when I was having such a tough time with dope. I knew what I was writing about. There was never any question. Annie was my drug problem, and she was my number-one fan. God, she never wanted to leave."
When further addressing the idea of whether the character of Paul Sheldon was based on himself, King stated that in certain ways, he was, but in the ways where every character is a part of the author in some way: "It would be fair enough to ask, I suppose, if Paul Sheldon in Misery is me. Certain parts of him are ... but I think you will find that, if you continue to write fiction, every character you create is partly you."

King has also attributed a dream he had while on a trans-Atlantic flight to London with the situation and characters that became fleshed out in Misery. He noted that he wrote the idea on an American Airlines cocktail napkin when he woke up so he could make sure to remember it, writing: "She speaks earnestly but never quite makes eye contact. A big woman and solid all through; she is an absence of hiatus. 'I wasn't trying to be funny in a mean way when I named my pig Misery, no sir. Please don't think that. No, I named her in the spirit of fan love, which is the purest love there is. You should be flattered.'"

King and his wife, Tabitha King, stayed in London's Brown's Hotel, where he wrote "sixteen pages of a steno notebook"; the concierge let him work at a desk once owned by Rudyard Kipling, who had died of a stroke while using it. King thought that the book would only be around 30,000 words, but it ended up being almost four times that at 370 pages. Its working title was The Annie Wilkes Edition. While discussing the pros and cons (mostly cons) of pre-plotting novels, King mentioned that he had originally planned for Annie to force her prisoner to write a book, which she would then bind in Paul's skin. When commenting on why he chose not to go that route, King said:
 ... it would have made a pretty good story (not such a good novel, however; no one likes to root for a guy over the course of three hundred pages only to discover that between chapters sixteen and seventeen the pig ate him), but that wasn't the way things eventually went. Paul Sheldon turned out to be a good deal more resourceful than I initially thought, and his efforts to play Scheherazade and save his life gave me a chance to say some things about the redemptive power of writing that I had long felt but never articulated. Annie also turned out to be more complex than I'd first imagined her, and she was great fun to write about ..."

Adaptations

Film
The novel was adapted into a film in 1990, directed by Rob Reiner and scripted by William Goldman. James Caan and Kathy Bates starred as Paul Sheldon and Annie Wilkes, with Lauren Bacall, Richard Farnsworth and Frances Sternhagen in supporting roles. The film was a critical and commercial success, and continues to be ranked as one of the best Stephen King adaptations. For her performance as Annie Wilkes, Kathy Bates won the 1991 Academy Award for Best Actress - one of the few Oscar wins for a performance in the horror genre, and the first for any King adaptation - and was launched into mainstream stardom. In June 2003, the American Film Institute included Annie Wilkes, as played by Bates, in their "100 Heroes and Villains" list, ranking her as the 17th most iconic villain (and sixth most iconic villainess) in the history of film.

Director Balu Mahendra loosely adapted the novel into a Tamil film titled Julie Ganapathi in 2003.

Television
A version of Annie Wilkes, portrayed by Lizzy Caplan, is the main character of the second season of Castle Rock. The season finale concludes with Annie attending a book signing for a Misery novel by Paul Sheldon.

Stage
The novel was also adapted into a play by Simon Moore. The play premiered in London at the Criterion Theater in December 1992, starring Sharon Gless and Bill Paterson and directed by Moore. The play, directed by Alan Cohen, was revived in 2005 at the Kings Head Theatre in London, starring Michael Praed and Susan Penhaligon.

In 2014, Dutch composer and theater producer Florus van Rooijen adapted the novel into a "feel bad" musical.

A different play written by William Goldman (who also wrote the film's screenplay) and directed by Will Frears opened on Broadway in 2015 for a limited engagement. The play starred Bruce Willis as Paul Sheldon and Laurie Metcalf as Annie Wilkes. It opened in October 2015 and closed on February 16, 2016. For her performance as Wilkes, Metcalf was nominated for a Tony Award for Best Actress in a Play. The play was originally premiered in 2012 at Bucks County Playhouse before moving to Broadway. This new version is not connected to the earlier adaptation by Simon Moore.

In October 2019, a Finnish play adaptation of Misery called Piina was performed at the Tampere Theatre in Tampere, Finland. The play was directed by Antti Mikkola and starring Esa Latva-Äijö as Paul Sheldon and Mari Turunen as Annie Wilkes. Also in September of the same year, Kuopio City Theatre in Kuopio, Finland presented another interpretation under the name Piina, directed by Olli-Matti Oinonen and starring Seppo Pääkkönen as Paul Sheldon and Henna Haverinen as Annie Wilkes. In November 2022, Pori Theatre in Pori, Finland presented third interpretation, directed by Tuomo Aitta and starring Vesa Haltsonen as Paul Sheldon and Mirva Tolppanen as Annie Wilkes.

Radio
Moore's stage adaptation was itself adapted for radio and broadcast on the BBC World Service.  The program was produced by Dirk Maggs, directed by Marion Nancarrow and starred Nicholas Farrell as Paul Sheldon and Miriam Margolyes as Annie Wilkes.  The program was later released on CD by the BBC.

References

External links
 
 
 Official Website for the play
 Misery at Worlds Without End.

1987 American novels
1980s horror novels
American novels adapted into films
American horror novels
Novels about bipolar disorder
Borderline personality disorder in fiction
Metafictional novels
Medical novels
Novels about mental health
Novels about writers
Novels by Stephen King
Novels set in Boulder, Colorado
American novels adapted into plays
Novels adapted into radio programs
Viking Press books
Novels about serial killers
Bram Stoker Award for Novel winners